is a district located in Ishikawa Prefecture, Japan.  The current total area is 456.69 km2.

The district has two towns.
Anamizu
Noto

District History
On March 1, 2005 the village of Yanagida and the town of Noto from Fugeshi District merged with the town of Uchiura from Suzu District to form the town of Noto.

This merger effectively merged both Suzu and Fugeshi districts and put Hōsu District in these areas since the borders of two districts had been wiped out. At the same time, the towns of Anamizu and Monzen, both formerly from Fugeshi District, became towns in Hōsu District.

The new district takes one kanji from each of its predecessors: the first kanji comes from Fugeshi (鳳至) and the second comes from Suzu (珠洲).

Changes since the creation
March 1, 2005 - Suzu and Fugeshi districts merged to form Hōsu District.
February 1, 2006 - The town of Monzen merged with the city of Wajima to form the city of Wajima.

Districts in Ishikawa Prefecture